Coal Harbour Water Aerodrome  is located at the village of Coal Harbour, British Columbia, Canada.

References

Seaplane bases in British Columbia
Regional District of Mount Waddington
Registered aerodromes in British Columbia